Shangzhi Township is a township in Chaoyang County, Liaoning, China. , it has seven villages under its administration:
Shangzhi Village 
Fanjiagou Village
Dachehu Village
Mijiagou Village
Zhengzhangzi Village
Erchehu Village
Fengzhangzi Village

References 

Township-level divisions of Liaoning
Chaoyang County